This is a list of video games developed and/or published by Koei Tecmo, one of their internal development houses, or the pre-merger companies Tecmo (formerly known as Tehkan) or Koei. Some games were only published by Tecmo or Koei in a specific region or for a specific platform; these games will only list the publisher relevant to this list (i.e. Tecmo or Koei) and will be notated appropriately. Also, many games have different release dates for different regions, platforms, or re-releases. For the purposes of simplicity, and to ensure easy automated sorting, only the earliest date will listed on this table.

References

Koei Tecmo
Koei Tecmo games